West Slope is an unincorporated suburb of Portland, Oregon, United States and a census-designated place. It is in Washington County, to the west of Portland's West Hills neighborhood, to the northwest of Raleigh Hills and south of U.S. Route 26. Fire protection and EMS services are provided through Tualatin Valley Fire and Rescue.

As of the 2000 census, the suburb population was 6,442. In a plan agreed to by the county and Beaverton, West Slope was scheduled for annexation to Beaverton by 2010.

Geography

Education
West Sylvan Middle School is located in West Slope south of U.S. Route 26. In the public school district, most children will attend either Raleigh Park Elementary, Ridgewood Elementary, or William Walker Elementary schools. Tweens will mostly enter either Whitford Middle school or Cedar Park middle school. Teen will usually attend Beaverton high school. These schools are all a part of the Beaverton school district.

Demographics

As of the census of 2000, there were 6,442 people, 2,873 households, and 1,643 families residing in the neighborhood. The population density was 3,727.1 people per square mile (1,437.7/km2). There were 3,057 housing units at an average density of 1,768.7/sq mi (682.3/km2). The racial makeup of the neighborhood was 88.70% White, 4.30% Asian, 1.44% African American, 0.70% Native American, 0.16% Pacific Islander, 2.22% from other races, and 2.48% from two or more races. Hispanic or Latino of any race were 4.77% of the population.

There were 2,873 households, out of which 26.2% had children under the age of 18 living with them, 45.9% were married couples living together, 7.8% had a female householder with no husband present, and 42.8% were non-families. 32.1% of all households were made up of individuals, and 8.4% had someone living alone who was 65 years of age or older. The average household size was 2.22 and the average family size was 2.85.

In the neighborhood the population was spread out, with 21.2% under the age of 18, 8.5% from 18 to 24, 30.8% from 25 to 44, 25.9% from 45 to 64, and 13.6% who were 65 years of age or older. The median age was 39 years. For every 100 females, there were 95.8 males. For every 100 females age 18 and over, there were 95.8 males.

The median income for a household in the neighborhood was $50,984, and the median income for a family was $66,974. Males had a median income of $46,232 versus $35,890 for females. The per capita income for the neighborhood was $32,514. About 6.8% of families and 8.1% of the population were below the poverty line, including 10.1% of those under age 18 and 0.6% of those age 65 or over.

References

External links
Beaverton Valley Times, the neighborhood's local newspaper
Citizen Participation Organization 3, the area neighborhood association

Census-designated places in Oregon
Portland metropolitan area
Unincorporated communities in Washington County, Oregon
Census-designated places in Washington County, Oregon
Unincorporated communities in Oregon